Mannheim, also known as Koffman House, Kauffman House, and Coffman House, is a historic home located near Linville, Rockingham County, Virginia. It was constructed circa 1788 by David Coffman, a descendant of one of the first German settlers in the Shenandoah Valley. David Coffman named his masterpiece after the German city from which the Coffmans originated.  Mannheim is a two-story, three bay, stone Colonial style dwelling.  It has a steep side gable roof with overhanging eaves and a central chimney. A two-story, Greek Revival style wood-frame ell with double porches was added to the rear of the dwelling about 1855. A front porch also added in the 19th century has since been removed.  Also on the property are the contributing two brick slave quarters, a log smokehouse, an office, a chicken shed, and the ruins of a stone spring house.  The house is representative of vernacular German architecture of the mid-to-late 18th century, as constructed in America.

Mannheim was occupied by successive generations of the Coffman family until 1880.  In the mid-1990s Mannheim was purchased by a James Madison University professor who restored it to its 18th-century appearance. It was listed on the National Register of Historic Places in 2004.

References

1788 establishments in Virginia
German-American culture in Virginia
Houses on the National Register of Historic Places in Virginia
Colonial architecture in Virginia
Greek Revival houses in Virginia
Houses completed in 1788
Houses in Rockingham County, Virginia
National Register of Historic Places in Rockingham County, Virginia
Pennsylvania Dutch culture in Virginia
Slave cabins and quarters in the United States